Buchanan is a town in Botetourt County, Virginia, United States. The population was 1,196 at the 2020 census. It is part of the Roanoke Metropolitan Statistical Area. It was the western terminus of the James River and Kanawha Canal when construction on the canal ended.

History
Buchanan was incorporated in 1832. The town of Pattonsburg was founded on the opposite side of the James River (named for Colonel James Patton), and was connected to Buchanan via a bridge. An 1855 gazetteer described Buchanan and Pattonsburg together containing "3 or 4 churches, 1 bank, 1 printing office, and several tobacco factories and mills." Buchanan was named for Virginia colonist John Buchanan (died 1769), a soldier and landowner who built Fort Fauquier on the James River, just south of the town.

The Buchanan Historic District, Greyledge, Lauderdale, Looney Mill Creek Site, and Wilson Warehouse are listed on the National Register of Historic Places.

Geography
Buchanan is located at  (37.525177, -79.683405).

U.S. Route 11 runs through the center of town as Main Street. Interstate 81 runs along the northwest side of the town, with access from Exit 167 to the north and Exit 162 to the south, both with Route 11. State Route 43 crosses the James River with Route 11 in the center of town; Route 43 leads northwest up the James River to U.S. Route 220 at Eagle Rock and southeast to the Blue Ridge Parkway and the Peaks of Otter.

Demographics

2020 census
As of the census of 2020, there were 1,196 people living in the town. The population density was 540 people per square mile (210/km2). There were 596 housing units. The racial makeup of the town was 91.9% White, 3.1% Black, 0.3% American Indian, 0.3% Asian, 0.0% Pacific Islander, 0.8% Other, and 3.7% from two or more races. Hispanic or Latino of any race were 1.8% of the population.

2000 census
As of the census of 2000, there were 1,233 people, 540 households, and 359 families living in the town. The population density was 510.1 people per square mile (196.7/km2). There were 579 housing units at an average density of 239.5 per square mile (92.4/km2). The racial makeup of the town was 90.84% White, 7.95% African American, 0.08% Native American, 0.32% Asian, and 0.81% from two or more races. Hispanic or Latino of any race were 0.73% of the population.

There were 540 households, out of which 25.4% had children under the age of 18 living with them, 51.5% were married couples living together, 11.3% had a female householder with no husband present, and 33.5% were non-families. 29.4% of all households were made up of individuals, and 15.6% had someone living alone who was 65 years of age or older. The average household size was 2.28 and the average family size was 2.79.

In the town, the population was spread out, with 20.6% under the age of 18, 6.6% from 18 to 24, 29.2% from 25 to 44, 23.9% from 45 to 64, and 19.7% who were 65 years of age or older. The median age was 41 years. For every 100 females, there were 88.5 males. For every 100 females age 18 and over, there were 86.1 males.

The median income for a household in the town was $32,500, and the median income for a family was $37,443. Males had a median income of $29,405 versus $20,565 for females. The per capita income for the town was $16,238. About 6.9% of families and 10.5% of the population were below the poverty line, including 14.2% of those under age 18 and 9.2% of those age 65 or over.

Government
Buchanan operates a council–manager form of government. Buchanan Town Council is composed of a mayor and four council members who are elected at-large.

Education
The town is served by Botetourt County Public Schools. Public school students residing in Buchanan are zoned to attend Buchanan Elementary School, Central Academy Middle School, and James River High School.

Notable people
 Mary Johnston, novelist and women's rights activist
 Matthew Ramsey, songwriter and lead singer of country-rock music group Old Dominion
 Hughie Thomasson, musician and member of Outlaws and Lynyrd Skynyrd born in Buchanan
 James Patton, first sheriff of Augusta County, owned a "small stone house" around 1750 at Cherry Tree Bottom, across the James River from Buchanan.
 John Buchanan, who lived for many years in the Anchor and Hope Plantation just west of the town.

Climate
The climate in this area is characterized by hot, humid summers and generally mild to cool winters.  According to the Köppen Climate Classification system, Buchanan has a humid subtropical climate, abbreviated "Cfa" on climate maps.

References

External links
 Town of Buchanan official website

Towns in Botetourt County, Virginia
Populated places on the James River (Virginia)
U.S. Route 11
Populated places established in 1832
1832 establishments in Virginia
Towns in Virginia